Thomas Francis Brzoza (born August 29, 1956) is a former American football player.  He played college football at the center and guard positions for the University of Pittsburgh from 1974 to 1977. He was a consensus first-team center on the 1977 College Football All-America Team. He was selected by the Pittsburgh Steelers in the 11th round of the 1978 NFL Draft, but he was injured and released in August 1978. Brzoza hired an attorney and made a claim that the practice session in which he was injured violated NFL off-season regulations against conducting practices with shoulder pads; he reached a settlement with the Steelers in March 1979.

References

1956 births
Living people
All-American college football players
American football centers
Pittsburgh Panthers football players
Players of American football from Pennsylvania